Jesús is a 2016 internationally co-produced drama film directed by Fernando Guzzoni. It was screened in the Discovery section at the 2016 Toronto International Film Festival.

Plot 
The film is based partly on the notorious Daniel Zamudio murder case, but the director has developed the story freely from the perspective of one of the culprits and their relationship with their father.

Cast 
 Nicolás Durán as Jesús
 Alejandro Goic as Héctor

References

External links
 

2016 films
2016 drama films
Colombian drama films
Chilean drama films
French drama films
Gay-related films
German drama films
Greek drama films
LGBT-related drama films
French LGBT-related films
2010s Spanish-language films
Chilean LGBT-related films
German LGBT-related films
Greek LGBT-related films
Colombian LGBT-related films
2016 LGBT-related films
2010s French films
2010s German films
2010s Colombian films
2010s Chilean films